Chalkias or Halkias is a Greek surname. The female version of the name is Chalkia or Halkia (Greek: Χαλκιά). Notable people with the surname include:

Ioannis Chalkeus or Chalkias (born 1667), Aromanian scholar
Kostas Chalkias (born 1974), Greek footballer
Georgios Halkias (born 1967), Greek Tibetologist and Buddhist scholar
Stavros Halkias (born 1989), American comedian

Greek-language surnames
Surnames